

K 

 514107 Kaʻepaokaʻawela
 
 
 
 
 
 
 
 
 
 
 
 
 
 
 
 
 
 
 
 
 
 
 
 
 
 
 
 
 
 
 
 3412 Kafka
 
 
 
 469705 ǂKá̦gára
 
 11949 Kagayayutaka
 
 
 
 
 
 
 
 
 
 
 
 
 
 
 
 
 
 
 
 
 
 
 
 1694 Kaiser
 
 
 
 
 
 
 
 
 
 
 
 
 
 
 
 
 
 
 
 
 
 
 
 
 
 
 
 
 
 4138 Kalchas
 
 
 
 
 
 
 
 
 
 
 
 
 
 
 
 
 22 Kalliope
 204 Kallisto
 
 
 
 
 
 
 
 51826 Kalpanachawla
 
 
 
 
 
 53 Kalypso
 
 
 
 
 
 
 
 
 
 5385 Kamenka
 
 
 
 
 
 
 
 
 
 
 
 
 
 
 
 
 
 
 
 
 
 
 
 
 
 
 469219 Kamoʻoalewa
 
 
 
 
 
 
 17683 Kanagawa
 
 
 
 
 
 
 
 5333 Kanaya
 
 
 
 
 
 
 
 
 
 
 
 
 
 
 
 
 
 4265 Kani
 
 
 
 
 
 
 
 
 
 
 
 
 
 
 
 
 
 
 
 
 1987 Kaplan
 
 
 818 Kapteynia
 
 
 
 
 
 
 
 
 
 
 
 3800 Karayusuf
 
 
 
 1682 Karel
 
 
 
 
 
 
 
 
 
 
 
 
 
 
 
 
 
 
 
 4822 Karge
 
 
 
 832 Karin
 
 
 
 
 
 
 2807 Karl Marx
 
 
 
 
 
 
 
 
 
 
 
 
 
 
 
 
 
 
 
 
 
 
 
 
 
 
 
 
 
 781 Kartvelia
 
 
 1316 Kasan
 
 
 
 
 
 
 
 
 
 
 
 
 
 114 Kassandra
 646 Kastalia
 3982 Kastelʹ
 
 
 
 
 1817 Katanga
 
 
 
 32145 Katberman
 
 2156 Kate
 
 
 
 
 
 
 
 
 
 320 Katharina
 
 
 
 
 
 
 
 
 
 
 
 
 
 
 3754 Kathleen
 
 
 
 
 
 
 
 
 
 
 
 
 
 
 
 
 
 
 
 
 
 
 
 
 
 
 
 1113 Katja
 
 
 
 
 
 
 
 
 
 
 
 
 
 
 
 
 
 
 
 
 
 
 
 
 
 1900 Katyusha
 
 
 
 
 
 
 
 
 
 
 
 
 
 
 
 
 
 
 
 
 
 
 
 
 
 6546 Kaye
 
 
 
 
 
 
 
 
 
 
 
 
 
 
 
 
 
 
 
 
 
 
 
 
 
 
 
 
 
 
 
 
 
 
 
 
 
 
 
 
 
 
 
 
 
 
 
 
 
 
 
 
 
 
 
 
 
 
 
 
 
 
 
 
 
 
 
 
 
 
 
 
 
 
 
 
 
 
 
 
 
 
 
 
 
 
 
 
 
 
 
 
 
 
 78431 Kemble
 
 
 
 
 2140 Kemerovo
 1508 Kemi
 
 
 
 
 
 
 
 
 
 
 
 
 
 
 
 
 
 
 
 
 
 
 
 
 
 
 
 
 7166 Kennedy
 
 
 
 
 
 2449 Kenos
 
 
 3714 Kenrussell
 
 
 
 
 
 
 
 
 
 
 
 
 
 
 
 
 
 
 
 
 
 
 
 1134 Kepler
 
 
 
 
 
 
 
 
 
 
 
 842 Kerstin
 
 
 
 
 
 
 
 
 
 
 
 
 
 
 
 
 
 
 
 
 
 
 
 
 
 
 
 
 
 
 
 
 
 
 
 
 
 
 
 
 
 
 
 
 
 1540 Kevola
 
 
 
 
 
 
 
 
 
 
 
 
 
 
 
 
 
 
 
 
 
 
 
 
 
 
 
 
 
 
 
 
 4707 Khryses
 
 3362 Khufu
 
 
 
 
 
 
 
 
 9916 Kibirev
 
 
 
 
 1759 Kienle
 
 
 
 1788 Kiess
 
 
 
 
 
 
 
 
 
 
 
 
 
 470 Kilia
 
 
 
 
 
 
 
 
 
 
 
 
 
 
 
 
 
 
 
 
 
 
 
 
 
 
 
 
 
 
 
 
 
 
 
 
 
 
 
 
 
 
 
 
 
 
 
 
 
 
 
 
 
 
 
 
 
 
 1780 Kippes
 
 1156 Kira
 
 
 
 
 
 
 
 
 
 
 
 
 
 
 
 
 
 9902 Kirkpatrick
 1578 Kirkwood
 
 
 
 
 
 
 
 
 
 
 
 
 
 
 
 
 
 
 
 
 
 
 
 
 
 
 
 
 
 
 3785 Kitami
 
 
 
 
 
 
 
 
 
 5481 Kiuchi
 
 
 
 
 
 
 
 
 
 
 
 
 
 
 
 1825 Klare
 
 
 
 
 
 
 
 
 
 
 
 
 
 
 
 
 
 
 
 
 216 Kleopatra
 
 
 
 
 
 
 
 
 19763 Klimesh
 
 
 
 
 
 
 
 
 
 
 84 Klio
 
 
 
 
 
 9344 Klopstock
 
 97 Klotho
 583 Klotilde
 
 
 
 1040 Klumpkea
 
 
 
 104 Klymene
 179 Klytaemnestra
 
 73 Klytia
 
 
 
 
 
 
 1384 Kniertje
 
 
 
 
 
 
 
 4868 Knushevia
 
 
 
 
 6498 Ko
 
 
 
 
 
 1164 Kobolda
 
 1233 Kobresia
 
 
 
 
 
 
 
 
 
 
 
 
 
 
 
 
 
 6500 Kodaira
 
 
 
 
 
 
 
 
 
 
 
 
 
 
 
 
 
 4177 Kohman
 
 1850 Kohoutek
 
 
 
 
 
 
 
 
 
 
 
 
 
 
 
 
 1522 Kokkola
 
 
 
 
 
 
 
 
 
 
 
 
 
 191 Kolga
 1929 Kollaa
 
 
 
 
 
 
 
 
 
 
 
 
 1836 Komarov
 
 
 
 
 1861 Komenský
 
 
 
 
 
 39741 Komm
 
 
 
 1283 Komsomolia
 
 
 
 
 
 6144 Kondojiro
 
 
 
 
 
 
 
 
 
 
 
 
 
 
 
 
 
 
 
 
 
 
 
 
 
 
 
 2008 Konstitutsiya
 
 
 
 
 
 
 
 1631 Kopff
 
 
 
 
 
 
 
 
 1505 Koranna
 
 
 940 Kordula
 
 
 
 
 
 
 
 
 
 
 
 
 1855 Korolev
 
 
 158 Koronis
 
 
 
 
 
 
 
 
 
 
 
 
 
 
 
 2072 Kosmodemyanskaya
 
 
 
 
 
 
 2726 Kotelnikov
 
 
 
 
 
 
 
 
 
 
 
 
 
 1799 Koussevitzky
 
 867 Kovacia
 
 
 1859 Kovalevskaya
 
 
 
 
 
 
 
 
 
 
 3040 Kozai
 
 
 
 
 4944 Kozlovskij
 
 
 
 
 
 
 
 
 
 
 
 
 
 
 
 
 
 
 
 
 
 
 
 
 
 
 
 
 
 
 
 
 
 
 
 1849 Kresák
 
 548 Kressida
 
 800 Kressmannia
 
 5285 Krethon
 
 
 
 488 Kreusa
 3635 Kreutz
 7604 Kridsadaporn
 
 242 Kriemhild
 
 
 
 
 
 
 
 
 
 
 
 
 
 
 
 
 
 
 
 
 
 
 
 
 
 24260 Kriváň
 
 
 
 
 
 3102 Krok
 
 
 
 
 
 
 
 
 
 
 
 
 
 
 
 
 
 
 
 
 
 
 
 
 
 
 
 
 
 4997 Ksana
 
 
 
 14968 Kubáček
 
 
 
 
 
 
 
 
 
 
 
 
 
 
 
 
 
 
 
 
 120375 Kugel
 
 2296 Kugultinov
 
 1776 Kuiper
 
 
 1954 Kukarkin
 2159 Kukkamäki
 
 
 
 
 
 
 
 
 
 
 
 
 
 
 6255 Kuma
 
 
 
 
 
 
 
 
 
 
 
 
 11133 Kumotori
 
 
 
 
 553 Kundry
 936 Kunigunde
 
 
 
 
 
 
 
 
 
 
 
 
 
 
 
 
 
 
 1503 Kuopio
 
 
 
 
 
 
 
 
 
 
 
 2349 Kurchenko
 
 
 
 
 
 
 
 
 
 
 
 
 3073 Kursk
 
 
 
 
 
 
 
 
 
 
 
 
 
 
 
 
 
 
 
 
 1559 Kustaanheimo
 
 
 1289 Kutaïssi
 
 
 
 
 
 
 
 
 
 
 
 
 
 
 
 
 
 
 
 
 
 
 
 
 
 
 
 
 
 
 
 
 
 
 
 
 
 
 
 
 669 Kypria
 
 
 
 
 
 570 Kythera
 6980 Kyusakamoto

See also 
 List of minor planet discoverers
 List of observatory codes

References 
 

Lists of minor planets by name